Marssonina is a genus of fungi in the family Dermateaceae.

The genus name of Marssonina is in honour of Theodor Friedrich Marsson (1816–1892), who was a German pharmacist and botanist.

The genus was circumscribed by Paul Wilhelm Magnus in Hedwigia vol.45 on page 89 in 1906.

Species

Marssonina acaciae
Marssonina acerina
Marssonina actaeae
Marssonina actinostemmae
Marssonina aegopodii
Marssonina agaves
Marssonina alni
Marssonina andurnensis
Marssonina apicalis
Marssonina aquilegiae
Marssonina artocarpi
Marssonina atragenes
Marssonina aurantiaca
Marssonina balsamiferae
Marssonina betulae
Marssonina bracteosa
Marssonina bupleuri
Marssonina californica
Marssonina campanulae
Marssonina canadensis
Marssonina capsulicola
Marssonina carnea
Marssonina carpogena
Marssonina celastri
Marssonina celtidis
Marssonina ceratocarpi
Marssonina chamerionis
Marssonina chrysothamni
Marssonina clematidicola
Marssonina clematidis
Marssonina daphnes
Marssonina decolorans
Marssonina deformans'''Marssonina dimocarpiMarssonina dispersaMarssonina ershadiiMarssonina erythraeaeMarssonina erythreaeMarssonina euphorbiaeMarssonina euphoriaeMarssonina extremorumMarssonina flourensiaeMarssonina forsythiaeMarssonina fraseraeMarssonina geiMarssonina gladioliMarssonina gloeodesMarssonina graminicolaMarssonina grossulariaeMarssonina halostachyosMarssonina indicaMarssonina ipomoeaeMarssonina junonisMarssonina kirchneriMarssonina kriegerianaMarssonina lappaeMarssonina lindiiMarssonina loniceraeMarssonina lorentziiMarssonina manschuricaMarssonina martiniiMarssonina matteianaMarssonina medicaginisMarssonina melampyriMarssonina melilotiMarssonina melonisMarssonina moravicaMarssonina myricariaeMarssonina necansMarssonina neilliaeMarssonina nigricansMarssonina obclavataMarssonina obscuraMarssonina obtusataMarssonina ochroleucaMarssonina omphalodisMarssonina pakistanicaMarssonina piriformisMarssonina polygoniMarssonina poonensisMarssonina populicolaMarssonina pruinosaeMarssonina psidiiMarssonina pteridisMarssonina punctiformisMarssonina quercinaMarssonina quercusMarssonina radiosaMarssonina rhabdosporaMarssonina rhamniMarssonina rhoisMarssonina ribicolaMarssonina rubiginosaMarssonina salicigenaMarssonina salicinaMarssonina salicisMarssonina salicis-purpureaeMarssonina sandu-villeiMarssonina santonensisMarssonina saxifragaeMarssonina senneniiMarssonina smilacinaMarssonina sojicolaMarssonina sonchiMarssonina sorbiMarssonina staritziiMarssonina stellariaeMarssonina stenosporaMarssonina tetraceraeMarssonina thomasianaMarssonina toxicodendriMarssonina tranzscheliiMarssonina truncatulaMarssonina veratriMarssonina violaeMarssonina viticolaMarssonina zanthoxyli''

References

External links

Dermateaceae genera